Hewlett or Hewletts may refer to:

 Bill Hewlett, an American entrepreneur
 Hewlett (surname)
 Hewlett Johnson (1874-1966), English clergyman, Dean of Manchester and Dean of Canterbury
 Hewlett Thompson (born 1929), Anglican former Bishop of Exeter
 Hewlett, New York, a hamlet and census-designated place
 Hewletts Creek, a stream in North Carolina
 Hewlett House (Cold Spring Harbor, New York), on the National Register of Historic Places

See also
 Hewlett-Packard, a technology corporation